The Teenage Mutant Ninja Turtles comic strip was started on December 10, 1990, by Creator's Syndicate as a daily. The strip ceased publication in January 1997.

The strip ran seven days a week, but (at least for part of its run) the Saturday strips consisted only of fan art and was not part of the storyline, which was published Monday through Friday. The Sunday edition featured a mix of puzzles and fan art early on, but later switched entirely to a fan-art format.

Among the creators who worked on the strip were Ryan Brown, Dan Berger, Jim Lawson, Michael Dooney, Steve Lavigne and Dean Clarrain.

Some of the TMNT daily strips have been reprinted in Comics Revue issues #58-82.

External links
 Official Teenage Mutant Ninja Turtles Website - Doin' a Daily Strip!
GoComics.com - The Strip at  GoComics.com

Strip
1990 comics debuts
1997 comics endings
Gag-a-day comics
Science fiction comic strips
Comics set in New York City
Comics about animals